Jan Hijzelendoorn (20 March 1929 – 22 October 2008) was a Dutch track cyclist who was active between 1948 and 1959. He competed at the 1948 and 1952 Summer Olympics in sprint events with the best achievement of eights place in the 1 km time trial in 1952. He won a bronze medal in the sprint at the 1950 world championships.

See also
 List of Dutch Olympic cyclists

References

External links
 

1929 births
2008 deaths
Dutch male cyclists
Olympic cyclists of the Netherlands
Cyclists at the 1948 Summer Olympics
Cyclists at the 1952 Summer Olympics
Cyclists from Amsterdam
20th-century Dutch people